Befokata Sud is a district in the region of Atsimo-Atsinanana in Madagascar.

Communes
The district is further divided into seven communes:

 Befotaka
 Ambohimasoa
 Ambondr
 Andasy
 Andioteny
 Andranovory, Befotaka
 Andria, Befotaka
 Ankazovelo, Befotaka
 Bekofafa
 Belenalena
 Morarano
 Soabonaka
 Soavariana
 Soarano
 Antaninarenina
 Antondabe (or Antondambe)
 Beharena
 Bekofafa Sud
 Marovitsika Sud
 Ranotsara Sud

Nature
It is the gateway to the Midongy du sud National Park (also called: Midongy-Betroka National Park) that is found in a distance of 34 km from Befotaka.

Mining
There are celestite crystals found in this district.

References

Districts of Atsimo-Atsinanana